This list is a subsection of the List of members of the National Academy of Engineering, which includes over 2,000 current members of the United States National Academy of Engineering, each of whom is affiliated with one of 12 disciplinary sections. Each person's name, primary institution, and election year are given. This list does not include deceased members.

References

Electric power and energy systems